Alexander Bence (born ca. 1590) was an English merchant and politician who sat in the House of Commons of England  from 1640 to 1648 and in 1654. He supported the Parliamentarian side in the English Civil War.

Bence was the son of Alexander Bence and his wife Marie Squier daughter of Thomas Squier.

In November 1640, Bence was elected Member of Parliament for Aldeburgh in the Long Parliament and sat until he was excluded under Pride's Purge. In 1642 he was appointed by parliament as one of the  Commissioners for the Affairs of (His Majesty's) Navy, the King having prevented all his principal officers of the navy from performing their duties. Bence was a member of the Worshipful Company of Grocers in the City of London and became an Alderman for Walbrook ward in May, 1653. In 1654 he was elected MP for Suffolk in the First Protectorate Parliament. He was master of Trinity House from 1659 to 1660.

Bence married as his first wife Anne Aylett of Rendham Suffolk and his son by her, John Bence was later also MP for Aldeburgh. Bence's brother Squire Bence was also MP for Aldeburgh during the Long Parliament.

References

1590s births
Year of death missing
Members of Trinity House
English MPs 1640–1648
English MPs 1654–1655
People from Aldeburgh
17th-century English businesspeople